Oksana Mykhailivna Kashchyshyna (born 15 February 1978 in Dnipropetrovsk) is a retired Ukrainian professional road cyclist. She represented her nation Ukraine at the 2008 Summer Olympics, and later joined with Italy's SC Michela Fanini (Record Rox) pro cycling team for the 2011 season under an annual contract.

Kashchyshyna qualified for the Ukrainian squad in the women's road race at the 2008 Summer Olympics in Beijing by receiving one of the nation's three berths from the UCI World Cup, along with her fellow riders Tetyana Styazhkina and Yevheniya Vysotska. She successfully completed a grueling race with a forty-second-place finish through a vast field of sixty-six cyclists in 3:34:13, trailing behind Germany's Judith Arndt by a 22-second gap.

Career highlights
2007
 2nd Ukrainian Championships (Road)
2008
 2nd Ukrainian Championships (Road)
 42nd Olympic Games, Beijing (CHN)
2009
 2nd Stage 1, Tour de Bretagne Féminin, France

References

External links
NBC 2008 Olympics profile

1978 births
Living people
Ukrainian female cyclists
Cyclists at the 2008 Summer Olympics
Olympic cyclists of Ukraine
Sportspeople from Dnipro